Mount Leonard Murray is a mountain in Papua New Guinea in central New Guinea.

Notes

References
 Merriam-Webster's Geographical Dictionary, Third Edition. Springfield, Massachusetts: Merriam-Webster, Incorporated, 1997. .

Mountains of Papua New Guinea